"Iron diplomacy" refers to the practice of transporting world leaders from Poland through Ukraine via rail since the start of the 2022 Russian invasion of Ukraine.  The expression was coined by Oleksandr Kamyshin, the head of Ukrainian Railways, because many diplomats were being shuttled by train to and from Kyiv, the capital city, as the use of Ukrainian airspace was impractical due to the invasion.  In addition, the first foreign leaders to visit Kyiv had decided to avoid travelling from Poland to Ukraine via a Polish military jet, in case Russia interpreted it as an escalating move. The journeys, including US President Joe Biden's 2023 visit, begin in Poland with a flight to Rzeszów-Jasionka Airport and then transfer to Przemyśl Główny railway station, where the visiting leaders board an overnight train to Kyiv.

Rail system 

Since the start of the Russian invasion in 2022, Ukraine's airspace has been closed and its roads have become unreliable due to fighting.  As a result, the country has been forced to rely heavily on its rail system for transport, including for humanitarian aid, refugees, weapons, and food for export.  As the rail system is crucial in Ukraine's resistance to the invasion, Ukrainian Railways has continued to run despite repeated attacks against the system, such as the attack on Kramatorsk station.  Security has also increased, and Oleksandr Kamyshin, who runs Ukrainian Railways, is now armed and accompanied by two bodyguards, keeps his schedule and location secret, and avoids physical contact with his family.

Diplomats and other world leaders who wish to travel through Ukraine are faced with a similar lack of options, so they regularly take part in Kamyshin's iron diplomacy program. The train ride takes nearly 10 hours. Ukraine also provides a security detail for the visiting leaders, and Kamyshin also keeps their travel details secret, but sometimes information ends up being publicized before the delegation has left Ukraine, which increases the risk of an attack.

Carriages 
One of the carriages used in the iron diplomacy program was originally constructed for rich tourists to the Crimean peninsula. Completed in 2014, it was used only a few times before Russia annexed the peninsula early that year. Recently modernized carriages from the Soviet era have also been used for the iron diplomacy program. Although most cars have been retrofitted with upscale furnishings to allow visiting leaders to travel comfortably, not all carriages have been refurbished to the same standard. Discrepancies regarding train car accommodations were noted by the French president Emmanuel Macron, the German chancellor Olaf Scholz, and the Italian prime minister Mario Draghi during their joint trip to Kyiv in June 2022.

Notable visits

See also 
 Compiègne Wagon

Explanatory notes

References 

Events affected by the 2022 Russian invasion of Ukraine
Diplomatic protocol
Diplomatic visits
Foreign relations of Ukraine
International rail transport
Luxury trains
Passenger rail transport in Ukraine
Passenger rail transport in Poland
Railway safety
Railway services introduced in 2022
Ukrainian Railways
Kyiv
Przemyśl
Rzeszów